The Swiss Cup Basel (formerly the Swiss Cup) is an annual curling tournament held in October in Basel, Switzerland. It is one of the earlier curling tournaments of the World Curling Tour season.

Past champions

References

External links
Website

World Curling Tour events
Recurring sporting events established in 2003
Curling competitions in Switzerland
Sport in Basel
2003 establishments in Switzerland
Champions Curling Tour events